This Life is a Canadian television drama series. It premiered on October 5, 2015 on CBC. The series is based on the French Canadian series Nouvelle adresse, created by Richard Blaimert. On March 31, 2016 the CBC confirmed the series had been renewed for a second season, to premiere in fall 2016. The show was cancelled on January 24, 2017.

Plot
Focusing on Natalie Lawson, a lifestyle columnist and single mother in her early forties whose terminal cancer diagnosis sends her on a quest to help her three teenage children get ready for the future, while trying her best to live in the now.

Cast
 Torri Higginson as Natalie Lawson  
 Lauren Lee Smith as Maggie Lawson
 Rick Roberts as Matthew Lawson
 Kristopher Turner as Oliver Lawson
James Wotherspoon as Caleb Lawson
Stephanie Janusauskas as Emma Lawson
Julia Scarlett Dan as Romy Lawson
 Peter MacNeill as Gerald Lawson
 Janet-Laine Green as Janine Lawson
 Marianne Farley as Nicole Breen
 Rachael Crawford as Danielle Berg
Helene Xia-Wong as Abigail Lawson-Breen (Abby)
 Shawn Doyle as Andrew Wallace
 Louis Ferreira as David Crowley
Hamza Haq as Raza Ali
Ambrosio De Luca as Julian
 Vincent Leclerc as Luke Carson
 Joe Cobden as Gregory Gilchrist

Episodes

Season 1 (2015)

Season 2 (2016)

References

External links 
  at CBC.ca
 

CBC Television original programming
2015 Canadian television series debuts
2016 Canadian television series endings
2010s Canadian drama television series
Television shows about writers
Television series about single parent families
Television series about cancer
Television shows about death
2010s Canadian medical television series